Liudmyla Babak (born 1 April 1997 in Enerhodar, Zaporizhzhia Oblast, Ukraine) is a Ukrainian sprint and marathon canoer. She is a three-time bronze medalist of the European Championships, with her first medal coming from the 2018 Europeans.

Babak specialises in canoe marathon competitions. She is World and European champion.

References

External links

Ukrainian female canoeists
Living people
1997 births
Sportspeople from Zaporizhzhia Oblast
21st-century Ukrainian women